Hoplocorypha garuana is a species of praying mantis found in Angola, Cameroon, Namibia, Tanzania, and Togo.

See also
List of mantis genera and species

References

Hoplocorypha
Mantodea of Africa